Lathrocordulia garrisoni is a species of dragonfly in the family Austrocorduliidae.
It is also known as the Queensland swiftwing.
It is endemic to north-eastern Australia. Its natural habitat is subtropical or tropical moist montane forests.

Gallery

Note
There is uncertainty about which family Lathrocordulia garrisoni best belongs to: Austrocorduliidae, Synthemistidae, or Corduliidae.

References

Austrocorduliidae
Odonata of Australia
Insects of Australia
Endemic fauna of Australia
Taxa named by Günther Theischinger
Taxa named by J.A.L. (Tony) Watson
Insects described in 1991
Taxonomy articles created by Polbot